Jackiellaceae is a family of liverworts belonging to the order Jungermanniales. The family consists of only one genus: Jackiella.

The genus name of Jackiella is in honour of Joseph (Josef) Bernard Jack (1818-1901), who was a German apothecary and botanist (Cryptogam and Bryophytes).

The genus was circumscribed by Viktor Felix Schiffner in Denkschr. Kaiserl. Akad. Wiss., Wien. Math.-Naturwiss. Kl. vol.70 on page 216 in 1900.

References

Jungermanniales
Jungermanniales genera